Qeshlaq-e Kelid Darreh (also Romanized as Qeshlāq-e Kelīd Darreh) is a village in Sahneh Rural District, in the Central District of Sahneh County, Kermanshah Province, Iran. At the 2006 census, its population was 67, in 16 families.

References 

Populated places in Sahneh County